Olivier Olibeau (born 13 April 1977) is a French rugby union footballer. He currently plays for USA Perpignan in the Top 14. His usual position is at lock.

He has also in the past played for both RC Narbonne and Biarritz Olympique, and he was also included in France's mid-year Test squad for 2007. He has won two caps for France and made his debut against New Zealand on 2 June 2007.

External links
 lequipe profile
 2Rugby profile

1977 births
Living people
French rugby union players
Sportspeople from Perpignan
Rugby union locks
Biarritz Olympique players
USA Perpignan players
France international rugby union players
RC Narbonne players